Duets: Hamburg 1991 is an album by American composer and saxophonist Anthony Braxton, recorded in 1991 and released on the Music & Arts label.

Reception
The AllMusic review by Thom Jurek stated: "This is a fascinating disc due in large part of Mr. Wilson's truly virtuoso playing of very difficult material, and for the rugged emotionalism Braxton puts into his own performance here".

Track listing
All compositions by Anthony Braxton.

 "Composition No. 156" - 8:49 
 "Composition No. 157 [Take One]" - 7:08 
 "Composition No. 152" - 10:54 
 "Composition No. 153" - 12:26 
 "Composition No. 155" - 6:00 
 "Composition No. 154" - 7:15 
 "Composition No. 40a" - 8:32 
 "Composition No. 157 [Take Two]" - 8:40 
Recorded at Müggenpark Studios in Hamburg, Germany on February 21 & 23, 1991

Personnel
Anthony Braxton - sopranino saxophone, alto saxophone, flute, contrabass clarinet
Peter Niklas Wilson - bass

References

Music & Arts albums
Anthony Braxton albums
1992 albums